Bickley Wood is a 9.5 hectare geological Site of Special Scientific Interest just north of  River Avon, near the village of Longwell Green, Bristol, notified in 1988.

Sources
 English Nature citation sheet for the site (accessed 9 July 2006)

Sites of Special Scientific Interest in Avon
Sites of Special Scientific Interest notified in 1988